John of Atholl was a bishop mentioned only in the Orkneyinga Saga as being sent by King David I of Scotland on a diplomatic mission to Orkney. He is called a Bishop "from Atholl" which could either mean he was Bishop of Dunkeld or that he held another episcopal see but originated in province of Atholl.

References
 Watt, D. E. R., Fasti Ecclesiae Scotinanae Medii Aevi ad annum 1638, 2nd Draft, (St Andrews, 1969)

12th-century deaths
History of Orkney
12th-century Scottish Roman Catholic bishops
Scottish diplomats
People from Perth and Kinross
Year of birth unknown